My Sassy Girl is a 2017 South Korean television drama starring Joo Won, Oh Yeon-seo, Lee Jung-shin and Kim Yoon-hye, based on the 2001 South Korean movie My Sassy Girl by Kwak Jae-yong, but during Joseon period. It aired on SBS from May 29 to July 18, 2017, on Mondays and Tuesdays at 22:00 (KST) time slot for 32 episodes.

Synopsis 
Love story of a cold city scholar Gyeon Woo  (Joo Won) who's known as "Joseon's national treasure" and the sassy princess Hye-myung (Oh Yeon-seo) in the Joseon Dynasty era who doesn't have the best reputation among the people. She often sneaks out of the palace in search of her mother, the dethroned queen. During one such adventure, she meets Gyeon Woo; initially enemies, then friends, they fall in love.

Cast

Main 
 Joo Won as Gyeon Woo
Jeon Jin-seo as young Gyeon Woo
An eminent and affable scholar who has returned after three years of study in Qing, where he was highly praised by its ruler. Gyeon Woo earned the title of 'National Treasure of Joseon' from King Hwijong during his childhood. He is the son of the education minister and the king appoints him as the tutor to the Heir Presumptive. Despite initial conflicts with Princess Hye-myung, he assists her, as she pursues the secrets surrounding her mother's dethronement.

 Oh Yeon-seo as Princess Hye-myung
She is a strong willed, independent yet mischievous and a trouble making person with a kind heart and cannot stand the wrongdoings of people. Initially she dislikes Gyeon Woo but, later falls in love with him. She is struggling to know what has happened to her mother.
 Lee Jung-shin as Kang Joon-young
The inspector at the police bureau. He cherishes princess Hyemyeong and always protects her.
 Kim Yoon-hye as Jung Da-yeon
She is the stubborn and spoiled daughter of the left minister Jung Ki-joon. She falls for Gyeon Woo and will do anything to get him. She is the love rival of princess Hye-myung.

Supporting

People in the Palace 
 Son Chang-min as King Hwijong
 Yoon Se-ah as Queen Park
 Yoon So-jung as Dowager Queen Jahye
 Choi Ro-woon as the Heir Presumptive, Princess Hye-myung's younger brother 
 Ryu Dam as Young-shin, eunuch to Princess Hye-myung
 Tae Mi as Byeol-i, Princess Hye-myung's bodyguard
 Lee Kyung-hwa as the Deposed Queen Han
 Hong Ye-seo as Court Lady Bang

Gyeon Woo's Family 
 Jo Hee-bong as Gyeon Pil-hyung, Gyeon Woo's father, Chief Scholar
 Jang Young-nam as Lady Heo, Gyeon Woo's mother
 Jung Da-bin as Gyeon Hee, Gyeon Woo's little sister who admires Jung Da-yeon and tries to help her get together with Gyeon Woo; she also cannot keep secrets

Ministers 
 Jung Woong-in as Jung Ki-joon, Left Minister and Jung Da-yeon's father
 Oh Hee-jung as Min Yu-hwan, Princess Hye-myung's teacher and close friend of Kang Joon-young
 Kim Byeong-ok as Park Sun-jae
 Kang Shin-hyo as Wol-myung 
 Park Geun-soo 
 Kim Young-suk

Others 
 Shim Hyung-tak as Choon-poong/ Prince Eunseong, younger brother of Prince Choosung
 Kwak Hee-sung as Park Chang-whi, Second Lieutenant of the Ministry of Supervision, which was granted by his father and has a crush on Jung Da-yeon
 Lee Si-eon as Bang Se-ho, Gyeon Woo's friend
 Seol Jung-hwan as Maeng Kwang-soo
 Park Young-soo as Hwang-ga
 Seo Eun-ah as Mal-geum, Jung Da-yeon's servant, falls for Bang Se-ho
 Han Ji-woo as Boo-yong
 Kim Yang-woo as Do-chi
 Jung Da-sol as So-yong
 Na Hye-mi as Bo-young
 Kris Sun (孙祖君) as Prince Darhan of Qing
 Noh Susanna as Sun-kyung
 Son Ji-yoon as Yoon-ji
 Ko Min-seo as Sun-kyung
 Lee Je-yeon
 Lee Si-gang
 Jung Tae-in
 Go Min-si as Seon-kyeong

Special appearance 
 Kim Min-jun as Prince Choosung
 Jo Jae-ryong as Butcher
 Park Jin-joo

Production 
The series is one of a handful of youth sageuk set in production after the success of Love in the Moonlight (2016) starring Park Bo-gum and Kim Yoo-jung.
This project marked the second collaboration between actor Joo Won and director Oh Jin-seok, after working together in the 2015 hit drama Yong-pal. The first script reading took place on August 27, 2016. My Sassy Girl is a fully pre-produced TV series. Filming began in August 2016 and finished on March 7, 2017.
Actress Kim Ju-hyeon was selected to play the female lead role through auditions, but was replaced by Oh Yeon-seo after quitting.

Ratings

Original soundtrack

Part 1

Part 2

Part 3

Part 4

Awards and nominations

International broadcast 
 In Singapore, Malaysia, Indonesia and Brunei, My Sassy Girl aired at the same time as its Korean broadcast on Sony One, In Taiwan it airs on CHOCO TV, friDay and KKTV, it also airs the day after the original date on IQiyi.
 In Hong Kong, the drama started airing on Viu starting from May 30, 2017.
 In Japan, the drama started airing on KNTV from June 3, 2017.
 In Taiwan, the drama started airing on LTV from June 29, 2017.
 In Sri Lanka, the drama is available to stream on-demand via Iflix with Sinhalese and English subtitles.
 In Malaysia, the drama started airing on NTV7 from February 6, 2018, Monday - Thursday, 6:00pm – 7:00pm.
 In the Philippines, the drama started airing on GMA Network from March 25, 2019, Monday - Friday, 9:20 AM, and reairs on GMA News TV from January 27, 2020, Monday - Friday, 11:00 PM.

See also 
 My Sassy Girl (2001)
 My Sassy Girl (2008)
 Ryokiteki na Kanojo (2008)
 Ugly Aur Pagli (2008)
 Sano Sansar (2008)
 My Sassy Girl 2 (2010)

Notes

References

External links
  

Seoul Broadcasting System television dramas
Alternate history television series
Korean-language television shows
2017 South Korean television series debuts
Television series set in the 18th century
South Korean historical television series
Television series set in the Joseon dynasty
South Korean romantic comedy television series
South Korean pre-produced television series
2017 South Korean television series endings
Television series by Studio Santa Claus Entertainment
Television series by RaemongRaein